Mesoscaphe is a type of submersible submarine invented by Jacques Piccard:

 , a Swiss research mesoscaph
 , a U.S. Navy research mesoscaph

See also
 Bathyscaphe
 Submarine

 Submarines by type